Federation of All Pakistan Universities Academic Staff Association also known as FAPUASA is an association of the universities academic staff all over Pakistan.

References

Professional associations based in Pakistan
Federations
Education-related professional associations
Higher education in Pakistan